Werner Rauh (16 May 1913 in Niemegk – 7 April 2000 in Heidelberg) was an internationally renowned German biologist, botanist and author.

Biography
Born in the town of Niemegk near Bitterfeld, Rauh studied at Biology faculty at the University of Halle under the morphologist Wilhelm Troll, and received his doctorate in Botany in 1937 before being appointed to the University of Heidelberg two years later. He discovered or described some 1200 genera, species and varieties of plants from Africa, the Americas and Asia. His fields of specialization were the Bromeliads and  succulent plants. He was a professor at the University of Heidelberg and Director of the Institute of Plant Systematics and Plant Geography as well as Director of the Heidelberger Botanical Gardens, and authored over 300 scholarly books and articles. His work on the succulent and xerophytic flora of Madagascar is presented in his two-volume work Succulent and Xerophytic Plants of Madagascar in 1995 and 1998.

He was honoured in the names of several flowering plants; in 1956, Curt Backeberg published Rauhocereus  (in the Cactaceae family), then Rauhia  (in the Amaryllidaceae family) was published in 1957  by Hamilton Paul Traub. Rauhiella  was published in 1978 (Orchidaceae) by Guido Frederico João Pabst and Pedro Ivo Soares Braga, then lastly Werauhia  (Bromeliaceae family) was published in 1995 by Jason Randall Grant.

Selected publications
 Kakteen an ihren Standorten, 1979, 
 Die 100 schönsten Kakteen, Humboldt-Taschenbuchverlag, 1980, 
 Die großartige Welt der Sukkulenten, 1979
 Schöne Kakteen und andere Sukkulenten, 1967
 Bromelien - Tillandsien und andere kulturwürdige Bromelien, Verlag Eugen Ulmer, Stuttgart 1990, 
 Succulent and Xerophytic Plants of Madagascar, Vol. 1 + 2, Strawberry Press, 1995 + 1998,

Expeditions

1950: Morocco
1954: Peru, Ecuador
1956: Peru
1959/1960: Madagascar, Tasmania, Kenya
1961: Madagascar, South Africa
1963: Madagascar, Comoros
1964: South Africa
1966: Mexico
1967: Peru
1968: South Africa
1969: Madagascar, Comoros
1970: Peru, Mexico
1971: USA
1973: Ecuador, Galapagos Islands Peru, Brazil
1974: Mexico
1975: Brazil, Colombia, Ecuador, Peru, Panama
1976: Peru, Bolivia, Chile
1977: USA   Guatemala, Costa Rica, Panama
1978: Indonesia, Papua New Guinea, Philippines
1979: Namibia, South Africa
1980: Mexico, Peru, Ecuador
1981: Brazil
1982: USA, Panama, Dominican Republic
1983: Ecuador, Peru, Argentina
1984: Venezuela, Dominican Republic, Panama
1985: USA, Mexico, Peru
1986: Brazil
1994: Madagascar

References

External links
 The Werner Rauh Heritage Project (WRHP), http://scriptorium.cos.uni-heidelberg.de/index.php?l=en
 http://fcbs.org/articles/WernerRauh.htm

20th-century German botanists
1913 births
2000 deaths
Recipients of the Cross of the Order of Merit of the Federal Republic of Germany
Veitch Memorial Medal recipients
University of Halle alumni
Academic staff of Heidelberg University
Scientists from Saxony-Anhalt